Abdikadir Hussein Mohamed (born 1971) is a Kenyan politician. As a member of Safina, Mohamed was elected to represent the Mandera Central Constituency in the National Assembly of Kenya in the 2007 Kenyan parliamentary election, defeating the incumbent Billow Kerrow.

Early life and education 
Abdiikadir was born in 1971 in Mandera District.  He attended Alliance High School and the University of Nairobi.

He holds a master's degree in law from Harvard Law School and was the chairman of the parliamentary committee on constitutional affairs that saw the draft of the new Kenyan constitution.

Political career 
He was elected MP in Lagdera at the 2022 Kenyan general election from the ODM

He is the chairman of the Constitution Implementation Oversight Committee in parliament.

Personal li 
Abdikadir is a Muslim. He and his wife are the parents of four children.

Abdikadir was awarded the German Africa Prize in 2011. He is formerly Senior Advisor to the president of the republic of Kenya

References

Living people
1971 births
Safina politicians
Kenyan Muslims
21st-century Kenyan politicians
Harvard Law School alumni
University of Nairobi alumni
Members of the National Assembly (Kenya)

Orange Democratic Movement politicians
Members of the 11th Parliament of Kenya
Members of the 13th Parliament of Kenya